Lenzburg is a town in Switzerland.  The term may also refer to:

Switzerland
Lenzburg (district), a district of the Canton of Aargau, of which Lenzburg is the capital
Schloss Lenzburg, a castle above the town of Lenzburg
Regionalbus Lenzburg AG, a local bus company

United States
Lenzburg, Illinois
Lenzburg Township, St. Clair County, Illinois